The prions or whalebirds are small petrels in the genera Pachyptila and Halobaena. They form one of the four groups within the Procellariidae along with the gadfly petrels, shearwaters and fulmarine petrels. The name comes from the Greek , meaning "saw", a reference of the serrated edges of the birds' saw-like bill.

They are found in the Southern Ocean and breed on a number of subantarctic islands. Three species of prion have flattened bills with a fringe of lamellae that act as strainers for zooplankton. All prions are marine and feed on small crustacea such as copepods, ostracods, decapods, and krill, as well as some fish such as myctophids and nototheniids.

List of species

 Pachyptila
 Pachyptila turtur, fairy prion
 Pachyptila belcheri, slender-billed prion
 Pachyptila crassirostris, fulmar prion
 Pachyptila vittata, broad-billed prion
 Pachyptila desolata, Antarctic prion
 Pachyptila salvini, Salvin's prion
 Halobaena
 Halobaena caerulea, blue petrel

In addition, fossil remains of some hitherto undescribed prehistoric species have been found. The oldest comes from the Late Miocene (Tortonian, some 7 to 12 million years ago) of the Bahía Inglesa Formation in Chile.

Footnotes

References
 
Cherel, Y., Bocher, P., De Broyer, C., Hobson, K.A., (2002) "Food and feeding ecology of the sympatric thin-billed Pachyptila belcheri and Antarctic P. desolata prions at Iles Kerguelen, Southern Indian Ocean" Marine Ecology Progress Series 228: 263–281

External links

 Antarctic prion homes-in on their life mate through smell

Bird common names
Extant Tortonian first appearances